The West Indies cricket team toured Pakistan for cricket matches in the 2006–07 cricket season. The tour immediately followed the 2006 ICC Champions Trophy in India, where West Indies reached the final, and they played their first tour match three days after playing the final. Pakistan's recent results included a 3–0 loss in a Test series in England, where the final match ended in farce, and they were eliminated at the group stage of the Champions Trophy. The Pakistan Cricket Board had also recently suspended fast bowlers Shoaib Akhtar and Mohammad Asif due to a doping case.

Squads

Tour matches

Patron's XI v West Indians

The PCB Patron's XI made 305 for four declared on the first day, with Salman Butt retiring after making 106, sharing an opening stand of 175 with Yasir Hameed, who was first to fall, caught behind off Dave Mohammed for 92. On the second day, West Indies replied with 279 for five, with Dwayne Bravo replicating Butt's feat. No bowler took more than one wicket in the game.

Test series

1st Test

West Indies batted first, but Pakistan earned a first innings lead of 279, enough to stretch West Indies' their sequence of Tests without a win to 14, and they had now played 17 Tests away from home without a win. The visitors started with an opening stand of 41, but then four wickets fell within 26 balls, and they were 52 for four. Brian Lara made a half-century and Dwayne Bravo and Dave Mohammed chipped in with 30s, but Umar Gul (five for 65 including the last three wickets) and Shahid Nazir (three for 42) had done the damage, and they were bowled out for 206.

Pakistan's score at the fall of the second wicket was just four ahead of the West Indies'; however, Mohammad Yousuf nearly outscored the West Indies on his own. He shared century stands with Shoaib Malik and Kamran Akmal, while Jerome Taylor took four wickets in his 33 overs. Dave Mohammed bowled 31 overs, taking three for 98 including the two last batsmen, but West Indies had to make 279 just to see Pakistan bat again.

They did, just. Overnight on day three they were 74 for three, with two wickets taken by Umar Gul, as opener Daren Ganga fell in single figures for the second time in the match. Nightwatchman Fidel Edwards hung around for an hour in a partnership of 45 with Lara, and Lara added a further 137, but three wickets fell in the eleven overs before tea on day four, starting with Lara going lbw to part-timer Mohammad Hafeez, who bowled four overs in the game. Shivnarine Chanderpaul was caught off Shahid Nazir with the new ball, and West Indies made 291 after Mohammed's 15; Pakistan chased 13, though they did lose one wicket, opener Hafeez lbw to Corey Collymore for the latter's only wicket in the game.

2nd Test

3rd Test

ODI series

1st ODI

2nd ODI

3rd ODI

4th ODI

5th ODI

References

External links
 

2006 in Pakistani cricket
2006 in West Indian cricket
International cricket competitions in 2006–07
Pakistani cricket seasons from 2000–01
2006–07